Galu Rud (also Romanized as Galū Rūd; also known as Galī Rūd, Gal Rūd, and Golī Rūd) is a village in Kuh Panj Rural District, in the Central District of Bardsir County, Kerman Province, Iran. At the 2006 census, its population was 63, in 16 families.

References 

Populated places in Bardsir County